In Real Life may refer to:
 In real life, Internet term
 In Real Life (band), an American boy band emanating from the TV series Boy Band  
 In Real Life (film),  2008 Dutch drama film directed by Robert Jan Westdijk
 In Real Life (TV series), Canadian reality television series 
 In Real Life: My Journey to a Pixelated World, book by Joey Graceffa
 In Real Life (Mandy Moore album), 2022

See also
Dan in Real Life, 2007 American comedy-drama film directed by Peter Hedges
Real Life (disambiguation)